The 1936 Wayne Tartars football team represented Wayne University (later renamed Wayne State University) as an independent during the 1936 college football season. In their fifth year under head coach Joe Gembis, the Tartars compiled a 5–2–1 record and shut out four of eight opponents.

Schedule

References

Wayne
Wayne State Warriors football seasons
Wayne Tartars football